The Southern Methodist Church Building, now known and used as the Upshur County Historical Society's History Center Museum, is an historic former church building located at 81 W. Main Street in Buckhannon, Upshur County, West Virginia. It was built in 1856 with final modifications in the 1890s, and is a simple rectangular frame building.  The original structure measures 45 feet by 33 feet in the Greek Revival style. In 1891, a 9 feet by 14 feet vestibule was added, along with a three-story bell tower. In 1968, it was sold to the Church of Christ and then sold to the Upshur County Historical Society in 1986.

It was listed on the National Register of Historic Places in 1992.

References

External links
Upshur County Historical Society website

Churches on the National Register of Historic Places in West Virginia
Methodist churches in West Virginia
Carpenter Gothic church buildings in West Virginia
Churches completed in 1856
19th-century Methodist church buildings in the United States
Buildings and structures in Upshur County, West Virginia
National Register of Historic Places in Upshur County, West Virginia
Bell towers in the United States
Southern Methodist churches in the United States